Kanchanjungha Express is an Express train of Indian Railways linking the states of West Bengal with Assam and Tripura. There are two Kanchanjungha Express they are 13175/76 Sealdah–Silchar Kanchanjunga Express and 13173/74 Sealdah–Agartala Kanchanjunga Express.

The train runs between Sealdah,  Silchar and Agartala.

13175/76 runs triweekly from Silchar,
13173/74 runs four times a week from Agartala. Tatkal scheme is available in it.

It is named after the Kangchenjunga peak of the Himalayan Mountains of Sikkim.

Route and halts 

The important halts of the train are:

 
 
 
 
 
 
 
 New Jalpaiguri (Siliguri)
 
 
 Kamakhyaguri Railway Station

Traction

From Sealdah to Guwahati it is hauled by a Sealdah based WAP-7 or Howrah based WAP-4. From Guwahati to Silchar it is hauled by twin WDP-4D-class diesel locomotive of Siliguri shed. Also due to ghat section, banker locomotive are attached to it.

Rake sharing
Sealdah–Silchar Kanchenjunga Express shares its rake with Sealdah-Agartala Kanchenjunga Express.

Notes

See also 

 Guwahati railway station
 Sealdah railway station
 Sealdah–Silchar Kanchenjunga Express
 Sealdah–Agartala Kanchenjunga Express

Other trains on the Kolkata – New Jalpaiguri sector
 22301/02 Howrah–New Jalpaiguri Vande Bharat Express
 12041/42 New Jalpaiguri–Howrah Shatabdi Express
 22309/40 Howrah–New Jalpaiguri AC Express
 12377/78 Padatik Express
 12344/45 Darjeeling Mail
 15959/60 Kamrup Express
 13175/76 Kanchanjunga Express/Sealdah–Agartala Kanchanjunga Express
 12345/46 Saraighat Express
 15722/23 New Jalpaiguri–Digha Express
 12518/19 Kolkata–Guwahati Garib Rath Express
 12526/27 Dibrugarh–Kolkata Superfast Express
 13141/42 Teesta Torsha Express
 13147/58 Uttar Banga Express
 12503/04 Bangalore Cantonment–Agartala Humsafar Express
 13182/83 Silghat Town- Kolkata Express
 22511/12 Lokmanya Tilak Terminus–Kamakhya Karmabhoomi Express
 12526/27 Dibrugarh–Kolkata Superfast Express
 15644/45 Puri–Kamakhya Weekly Express (via Howrah)
 12364/65 Kolkata–Haldibari Intercity Express
 12509/10 Guwahati–Bengaluru Cantt. Superfast Express
 12507/08 Thiruvananthapuram–Silchar Superfast Express
 12514/15 Guwahati–Secunderabad Express

References

External links 

 15657/Kanchanjunga Express
 15658/Kanchanjunga Express

|

Named passenger trains of India
Rail transport in Assam
Rail transport in Jharkhand
Rail transport in Bihar
Rail transport in West Bengal
Transport in Guwahati
Transport in Kolkata
Express trains in India